The following individuals have started games at the quarterback position for the USC Trojans football team, updated from 1975 through 2022.  Inductees into the College Football Hall of Fame are designated alongside the player's final season.  Players who had taken a redshirt season are designated.

References

USC Trojans

USC Trojans quarterbacks